Jakob Jørgensen is a Danish furniture designer who mainly works in wood. He collaborates with Line Depping under the name Depping & Jørgensen. He graduated from Danmarks Designskole in 2007.

Selected works
 Barca, Condehouse
 Fjarill, Galerie Maria Wettergren
 Poets BookBook Hanger, mindcraft12
 Cloth Box, Galerie Maria Wettergren
 Tray Table, SE11
 Reol, 'Skud på stammen
 Rools, mindcraft14
 IO
 Baum, Galerie Maria Wettergren
 ISAK,  IFDA

Exhibitions
Jørgensen has exhibited at Galerie Maria Wettergren in Paris and has been represented on the Cabinetmakers’ Autumn Exhibition since 2009. In February–May 2018, he is one of four designers featured at the exhibition Halstrøm, Odgaard, Depping, Jørgensen at A. Petersen's exhibition space Bygning A in Copenhagen.

Awards
 Barca won 1st prize in the IFDA competition in 2008.
 2011 Bodum Design Award (Depping & Jørgensen)
 2012 Wallpaper* Design Award

References

External links

 Official website

Living people
Danish furniture designers
Year of birth missing (living people)